List of historic houses is a link page for any stately home or historic house.

Australia
List of historic houses in South Australia
Houses in New South Wales
Houses in Sydney
List of heritage houses in Sydney

Belgium
List of castles and châteaux in Belgium

China
Historic houses in Hangzhou

Denmark
List of historic houses in Denmark
List of historic houses in metropolitan Copenhagen

Estonia
List of palaces and manor houses in Estonia

France
List of châteaux in France

Ireland
List of historic houses in the Republic of Ireland

Italy
List of palaces in Italy
Preserved Ancient Roman Imperial edifices are quite abundant on the Palatine Hill.

Latvia
List of palaces and manor houses in Latvia

Libya
Karamanly House Museum

Mexico
List of historic house museums in Mexico

Morocco 
 Dar Adiyel
 Dar Ba Mohammed Chergui
 Dar Cherifa
 Dar Glaoui
 Dar Jamai, Fez
 Dar Jamai, Meknes
 Dar Moqri
 Dar Mnebhi, Fez
 Dar Mnebhi, Marrakesh
 Dar Moulay Ali
 Dar Si Said
 Mouassine Museum
 Kasbah Amridil

Netherlands
Rietveld Schröder House

Poland
Holy Father John Paul II Family Home in Wadowice

South Africa
Eerste Pastorie Winburg

Sweden
List of castles and palaces in Sweden

United Kingdom
List of country houses in the United Kingdom
References:

United States
List of historic houses in Florida
List of historic houses in Kentucky
List of historic houses in Massachusetts
Historic houses in Missouri
Historic houses in Nebraska
Historic houses in Virginia
Historic houses in Pennsylvania

See also

 United States National Register of Historic Places listings
 List of abbeys and priories
 List of buildings
 List of castles
 List of museums

References

External links
 Estonian Manors Portal - the English version introduces the 438 well-preserved manors (manor-houses) in Estonia

Architecture lists
Historic preservation
 List
Lists of buildings and structures